Alexandre Tiedtke Quintanilha, GOSE (born August 9, 1945 in Lourenço Marques (now Maputo), Mozambique) is a Portuguese scientist, former director of the Instituto de Biologia Molecular e Celular (Institute of Molecular and Cell Biology) of the University of Porto and Professor at ICBAS - Abel Salazar Institute of Biomedical Sciences.

Biography 
Alexandre Tiedtke Quintanilha, GOSE was born in Lourenço Marques (now Maputo) Portuguese East Africa on August 9, 1945, at the time a Portuguese colony. His father, Aurélio Quintanilha, was Portuguese, from the Azores islands, and one of the first scientists to study fungi.  Aurélio Quintanilha worked in Coimbra, Berlin and Paris. Alexandre Quintanilha's mother was German, from Berlin. The family moved to Mozambique in the 1940s, where Alexandre was born.

Studies 
Quintanilha completed his secondary school studies in Lourenço Marques, then went to South Africa to study at university level. He completed his B.Sc. (Hons) in theoretical physics in 1967 (University of the Witwatersrand, in Johannesburg), and his Ph.D. in solid state physics in 1972 (University of Paris).

Work 
Quintanilha switched his focus to biology on moving to California in 1972.  He worked for nearly 18 years at the University of California, Berkeley, in the US, before returning to Portugal in 1990 and becoming director of the Instituto de Biologia Molecular e Celular (Institute of Molecular and Cell Biology) of the University of Porto.

Personal life 
Alexandre is married to his longtime partner, North-American writer and journalist Richard Zimler. They married as soon as same-sex marriage was legalized in Portugal, in 2010. Since 1990 the two men have been living in Porto, Portugal.

External links 
European Science Foundation appoints Alexandre Tiedtke Quintanilha as new chairman of the Standing Committee for Life and Environmental Sciences
Alexandre Quintanilha on BioTEthics
Alexandre Quintanilha on National Geographic Portugal (Portuguese)

Portuguese people of German descent
Portuguese scientists
Living people
Portuguese LGBT scientists
Portuguese gay men
University of the Witwatersrand alumni
1945 births
Gay scientists
Gay academics
21st-century Portuguese LGBT people